Karl Camillo Schmidt-Hellerau (1 February 1873 – 6 November 1948) was a German carpenter, furniture manufacturer and social reformer. He was born in Zschopau, and is notable as the founder of Hellerau, Germany's first garden city, where he died.

1873 births
1948 deaths
People from Zschopau
German furniture makers
German carpenters
German social reformers